This is a list of productions produced by Illumination (formerly known as Illumination Entertainment), an American film and animation studio based in Santa Monica, California, United States. This includes feature films, television specials, shorts, and digital series.

Their upcoming slate of films includes The Super Mario Bros. Movie and Migration (both in 2023), and Despicable Me 4 in 2024.

Feature films
All films are co-produced and distributed by Universal Pictures, with the exceptions of Hop, which is a co-production with Relativity Media, and The Super Mario Bros. Movie, which will be a co-production with Nintendo.

Released

Upcoming

In development

Short films

Television specials

Series

Web series

Unproduced films

Reception

Box office performance

Critical and public response

See also
 List of Universal Pictures theatrical animated feature films
 List of DreamWorks Animation productions

References



Lists of films by studio
American films by studio
Illumination (company) animated films